Bishop O'Dowd High School is a Catholic, co-educational, college preparatory school in Oakland, California, administered by the Roman Catholic Diocese of Oakland and named after the late auxiliary Bishop of the Archdiocese of San Francisco, James T. O'Dowd (1907–1950). The school requires all students to attend school liturgies (Catholic Mass and prayer services), to enroll in religious studies courses each semester, and to complete its 4-year service learning program. O’Dowd is a Catholic high school community of 1,212 students. The school has 129 faculty and staff members and more than 82 part-time coaches, teachers and moderators.

History
Bishop O’Dowd High School is named in memory of the former Superintendent of Schools of the Archdiocese of San Francisco, Bishop James T. O’Dowd, who died at the age of 42 from injuries sustained in a train accident. Having just helped to establish Marin Catholic and Riordan high schools, O'Dowd was in the process of drawing up plans for a new Catholic high school in the East Bay at the time of his sudden death.

Bishop O'Dowd's first senior class graduated in 1955, and since then O'Dowd has had over 12,000 graduates.

In June 2010, O’Dowd successfully completed a three-year, $9 million comprehensive fundraising campaign and funds raised were split about evenly between capital development and program enhancement. Funds contributed to renovation of many elements of the classroom buildings — from floors to ceilings, interior and exterior, every classroom, lab and locker, from ventilation to technology infrastructure.

Athletics
In 2015, the men's basketball team won the CIF Open Division Championship and the women's team won the Division III CIF State Championship. The men's team was led by Ivan Rabb, the no. 8 player in the country. As of 2015, O'Dowd's basketball team was ranked 13th nationally.

Programs and extracurricular activities
 21 AP courses
 10 Honor Courses
 Athletics: 61 teams, 16 sports
 4 musical groups
 Student clubs: 40+
 Students spend a minimum of 100 hours in community service by graduation
 Center for Environmental Studies (a building)
 The Living Lab – a 4.857 1/2 acre student-built vegetable and botanical garden

Awards
Bishop O'Dowd High School was recognized as a Blue Ribbon School in 1990–1991.

Alumni
The Matches, pop-punk band
Alijah Vera-Tucker, football player
Tarik Glenn, football player
Jevon Holland, football player
Jasmine Guillory, novelist
Maya Harris, lawyer & writer
Ivan Rabb, basketball player
Kevin King, football player
Brian Shaw, basketball player
Matt Bettinelli-Olpin, musician and filmmaker
Michael A. Goorjian, actor & filmmaker
Kirk Morrison, football linebacker & radio analyst
Brandon Ashley, basketball player
Tyson Ross, baseball player
Langston Walker, football player
Grady Livingston, college basketball player
Jeff Kobernus, baseball player
Dennis Montali, bankruptcy judge
Meghan Kalkstein, broadcast journalist
Sean Aaberg, comics artist
Burl Toler III, football player
Ryan Drese, baseball player
Eric Bjornson, football player
Alexi Pappas, runner, filmmaker, actor, & author
Luis Scott-Vargas, game designer and member of the Magic: The Gathering Hall of Fame

Footnotes

External links

 Official Bishop O'Dowd High School website

Educational institutions established in 1951
Roman Catholic Diocese of Oakland
Catholic secondary schools in California
High schools in Oakland, California
1951 establishments in California